Samia Shoaib is a Pakistani-born American writer and former actress.

Biography
She moved to the United States where she studied English and Theater at the University of California, Berkeley and George Washington University. She studied acting at the Royal Academy of Dramatic Arts in London. She completed a Masters of Fine Arts at Columbia University.

Filmography

References

External links

Living people
Pakistani emigrants to the United States
University of California, Berkeley alumni
George Washington University alumni
Columbia University School of the Arts alumni
Alumni of RADA
American film actors of Pakistani descent
American film actresses
People with acquired American citizenship
1970 births